After the 1994 Danish parliamentary election, the sitting Danish Prime Minister Poul Nyrup Rasmussen was able to form a government coalition of his own Social Democrats, the Danish Social Liberal Party and the Centre Democrats. The resulting cabinet, which replaced the Cabinet of Poul Nyrup Rasmussen I, was formed on 27 September 1994 and was called the Cabinet of Poul Nyrup Rasmussen II.

The cabinet was replaced by the Cabinet of Poul Nyrup Rasmussen III on 30 December 1996, after the Centre Democrats left the government coalition in protest against the government negotiating the Budget of 1997 with the Socialist People's Party and the Unity List.

Cabinet changes
The cabinet was changed on 1 November 1994.

Some periods in the table below start before 27 September 1994 or end after 30 December 1996 because the minister was in the Cabinet of Poul Nyrup Rasmussen I or the Cabinet of Poul Nyrup Rasmussen III as well.

The cabinet consisted of:

References
 List of Danish governments – from the official website of the Folketing

1994 establishments in Denmark
1996 disestablishments in Denmark
Rasmussen, Poul Nyrup 2
Cabinets established in 1994
Cabinets disestablished in 1996